Isaac Hernández Bolívar (born 9 May 1991 in Medellín) is a Colombian former professional cyclist, who rode professionally between 2011 and 2015.

Major results

2010
2nd Overall Vuelta de Higuito
3rd Time trial, National Under-23 Road Championships
2011
1st Stage 6 Vuelta a Colombia U23
2nd Time trial, National Under-23 Road Championships
2012
1st Stage 5 Vuelta a Guatemala
2013
1st  Time trial, National Under-23 Road Championships
Pan American Under-23 Road Championships
2nd Time trial
3rd Road race
2014
3rd Overall Tour de Langkawi

References

External links

1991 births
Living people
Colombian male cyclists
Sportspeople from Medellín
21st-century Colombian people